The discography of New Found Glory, an American rock band. Consists of twelve studio albums, 34 singles, three extended plays (EPs), four cover albums, one live album, and two greatest hits compilation albums.

Albums

Studio albums

Live albums

Compilation albums

Cover albums

Video albums

EPs

Splits

Singles

Other appearances

Music videos

References 
General

 
 

Specific

External links 
New Found Glory at Epitaph Records

New Found Glory at MusicBrainz

Discographies of American artists
Pop punk group discographies